Lyudmila Chernyshova (born November 1, 1952) is a former volleyball player for the USSR. Born in Moscow, she competed for the Soviet Union at the 1976 and 1980 Summer Olympics.

References 

Living people
1952 births
Sportspeople from Moscow
Soviet women's volleyball players
Olympic volleyball players of the Soviet Union
Volleyball players at the 1976 Summer Olympics
Volleyball players at the 1980 Summer Olympics
Olympic gold medalists for the Soviet Union
Olympic silver medalists for the Soviet Union
Olympic medalists in volleyball
Medalists at the 1980 Summer Olympics
Medalists at the 1976 Summer Olympics
Honoured Masters of Sport of the USSR